Fresna jacquelinae is a species of butterfly in the family Hesperiidae. It is found in Cameroon.

Etymology
The species is named for Jacqueline Miller of the Allyn Museum in Sarasota, Florida, United States, in recognition of her contributions to Afrotropical lepidopterology.

References

Endemic fauna of Cameroon
Butterflies described in 2003
Astictopterini